Wok Express is an Indian, Pan-Asian food brand in the QSR (quick-service restaurants) space. Wok Express was launched in Mumbai in May 2015.

Wok Express currently has 25 restaurants across Mumbai, and started its first restaurant in Pune in July 2018. 

Lenexis FoodWorks, the parent company, has plans to expand its presence to up to 150 locations in the coming years.

Overview 
Wok Express, known for their – ‘Make your own wok’ offers guests a wide range of Pan Asian cuisines which predominantly includes dishes from Thai, Chinese, Japanese & Burmese cuisines. Woks are served in a variety of sizes.

References 

Fast-food restaurants
Chinese cuisine
Restaurants established in 2015
Indian brands